Giorgos Tzifos (1918 – 27 May 1986) was a Greek actor in theater and movies.  He played mostly secondary roles in comedies, even Law 4000 of Giorgos Dalianidis.  I Will Make You Queen (as a builder) and I de gyni na fovitai ton andra as a chauffeur.  In 1982, he appeared in the movie Alaloum with Harry Klynn.  He also appeared in that time in a television series about milk, as a hero of little Bobo.  He died on 27 May 1986 and is buried in Athens Cemetery.

Selected filmography

As cinematographer

Television

References

External links

1918 births
1986 deaths
Greek male actors
Male actors from Attica
20th-century Greek male actors